= Cotton Bowl =

Cotton Bowl may refer to:

- Cotton Bowl Classic, an annual college football post-season bowl game
- Cotton Bowl (stadium), American football stadium located in Fair Park, Dallas, Texas; former venue for Cotton Bowl Classic
